Australian Ghost Story is an album by Australian group The Paradise Motel. It was released in June 2010 on Left Over Life to Kill and Inertia Records to positive reviews.

Track listing

Personnel
 Merida Sussex – vocals
 Matt Aulich – guitars, arrangements
 Esme Macdonald – bass guitar
 Mark BJ Austin – keyboards, organ, pedal steel
 Andy Hazel – drums
 Campbell Shaw – violins
 Charles Bickford – various

Themes
The album was released to coincide with what would have been the 30th birthday of Azaria Chamberlain, and was cited in national press as an insightful and respectful companion-piece to the resurgence in media interest in the case. Chief songwriter Charles Bickford stated "We wanted to write a record about a contemporary event that was unique to Australia and part of our shared experience. A lot of artists explore things like convicts eating each other, but to me that's the ancient past."

References

2010 albums
The Paradise Motel albums